Hirotsugu or Hirotugu (written: 洋次, 広次 or 弘次) is a masculine Japanese given name. Notable people with the name include:

, Japanese statistician
, Japanese cyclist
, Japanese footballer

Japanese masculine given names